IHRD may refer to:

Institute of Human Resources Development, Kerala, India
International Holocaust Remembrance Day